Desolation Sounds is the fourth album by English hardcore punk band Gallows and the second full-length to feature vocalist Wade MacNeil, who replaced original frontman Frank Carter in August 2011.

The album is a departure from Gallows' fast-paced hardcore punk style, incorporating more post-punk and gothic rock influences.

Reception

The album received generally positive reviews.

Track listing

Personnel
 Wade Macneil – lead vocals
 Laurent "Lags" Barnard – guitar, backing vocals, keyboards
 Stuart Gili-Ross – bass, backing vocals
 Lee Barratt – drums, percussion

References 

Bridge 9 Records albums
Gallows (band) albums
2015 albums